The women's 100 metres at the 2022 European Athletics Championships took place at the Olympiastadion on 15 and 16 August.

Records

Schedule

Results

Round 1
First 4 in each heat (Q) and the next 3 fastest  (q) advance to the Semifinals. The nine highest ranked entrants received a bye to the Semifinals

Semifinals
First 2 in each Semifinal (Q) and the next 2 fastest  (q) advance to the final.

Final
Wind: +0.1 m/s

References

100 W
100 metres at the European Athletics Championships
Euro